Atareta Kawana Ropiha Mere Rikiriki (1855 – 13 March 1926), known as Mere Rikiriki, was a New Zealand prophet. Of Māori descent, she identified with the Ngati Apa iwi. She was born in  New Zealand in about 1855.

References

1855 births
1926 deaths
Māori prophets
New Zealand Māori religious leaders
Ngāti Apa people